Juigné-sur-Sarthe (literally Juigné on Sarthe) is a commune in the Sarthe department in the region of Pays de la Loire in north-western France.

Monuments
 Manoir de Vrigné
 Château de Juigné

See also
 Communes of the Sarthe department

References

Communes of Sarthe